William Anderson Gilligan (1876–1914) was a Scottish footballer who played in the Scottish Football League for Dundee and in the Football League for Bolton Wanderers.

He was one of four brothers who were professional footballers, the others being Sandy, Sam and John.

References

1876 births
1914 deaths
Scottish footballers
Footballers from Dundee
Scottish Junior Football Association players
Scottish Football League players
English Football League players
Association football wing halves
Dundee F.C. players
East Craigie F.C. players
Derby County F.C. players
Bolton Wanderers F.C. players
Scottish people of Irish descent